Prince Sisowath Ritharavong (February 6, 1935 – 1975) was the father of Prince Sisowath Sararith, son of Prince Sisowath Sisura (line of Prince Sisowath Essaravong). His mother was Princess Sisowath Darameth, daughter of Prince Sisowath Dung Leakhana.

He served in the Royal Cambodian Navy Rank in US Military equivalent O-5 (US Navy Captain... US Army "Bird" or Full Col.) March 3, 1975 when he was arrested by the Khmer Rouge. Ritharavong was imprisoned at S-21 prison, Phnom Penh where he is believed to have been executed. Many members of the Cambodian Royal family were executed quietly at the Olympic Stadium soon after the fall of Phnom Penh in April, 1975. To date no records of these executions have been found.

The Prince was married to Ms. Hubertine Belconde and had two children, Chhath Noreth and Theraknhean, who are now living in the United States.

References

1935 births
1975 deaths
Cambodian princes
People of the Vietnam War
Executed royalty
Cambodian anti-communists
Cambodian military personnel
Executed Cambodian people
People executed by the Khmer Rouge
House of Sisowath